Aujla Banwali is a village in Kapurthala district of Punjab State, India. It is located 5 km away from Kapurthala, which is both district and sub-district headquarters of Aujla Banwali village. The village is administered by sarpanch, an elected representative of the village.

History
Aujla Banwali, Kapurthala, is over 200 years old and was founded by two brothers of the Aujla clan, Sardar Joga Singh Aujla and Sardar Banwal Singh Aujla. They were the grandsons of Sardar Jassa Singh Ahluwalia who had conquered Kapurthala decades before their birth. Sardar Joga Singh Aujla had 12 sons and Sardar Banwal Singh Aujla had 10 sons.

Demography 
According to the report published by Census India in 2011, Aujla Banwali has a total number of 110 houses and population of 510 of which include 246 males and 264 females. Literacy rate of Aujla Banwali is 80.46%, higher than state average of 75.84%. The population of children under the age of 6 years is 34 which is 6.67% of total population of Aujla Banwali, and child sex ratio is approximately 1000 higher than state average of 846.

Population data

Air travel connectivity 
The closest airport to the village is Sri Guru Ram Dass Jee International Airport.

Villages in Kapurthala

External links
  Villages in Kapurthala
 Kapurthala Villages List

References

Villages in Kapurthala district